Keith W. Dayton (born March 7, 1949) is a retired lieutenant general in the United States Army who currently serves as the director of the George C. Marshall European Center for Security Studies in Garmisch-Partenkirchen, Germany. Dayton served as the U.S. Security Coordinator for Israel-Palestinian Authority in Tel Aviv, Israel from December 2005 to October 2010. He has also served as the Director of the Iraq Survey Group, as a senior member of the Joint Staff, and as U.S. Defense Attaché in the U.S. Embassy in Moscow, Russia.

Career
After graduating from the College of William & Mary in 1970, Dayton was immediately commissioned as an artillery officer through the Reserve Officer Training Corps. He received Russian language training at the Defense Language Institute and trained as a foreign area officer (FAO) with an emphasis on the former Soviet Union. Prior to his current assignment, he spent 37 years in a variety of command and staff assignments, most recently serving as the director of the Iraq Survey Group during Operation Iraqi Freedom and as Director of Strategy, Plans and Policy, Office of the Deputy Chief of Staff, G-3, United States Army, before his assignment as U.S. Security Coordinator for Israel and the Palestinian Authority.

Other key assignments include deputy director for Politico-Military Affairs, Joint Staff; United States Defense Attaché, Moscow, Russia; senior Army fellow on the Council on Foreign Relations, New York; commander, Division Artillery, 3rd Infantry Division (Mechanized), Germany; and commander, 4th Battalion, 29th Field Artillery; 8th Infantry Division (Mechanized), Germany.

He has written many technical articles over the course of his career, as well as was one of the co-authors of The Future of NATO: Facing an Unreliable Enemy in an Uncertain Environment, a study on the future of NATO published in 1991.

Lt. Gen. Dayton served five years as the United States Security Coordinator (USSC) for Israel and the Palestinian Authority. His leadership of the USSC team included overseeing the training of Palestinian Authority forces. Lt. General Dayton was widely lauded for his "rebuilding" of the Palestinian National Security Service, with thousands of members training in neighboring Jordan. He left Israel in October 2010 and retired from the military in December 2010. In 2018, Defense Secretary James Mattis appointed Dayton to serve as the senior U.S. defense advisor to Ukraine.

In December 2019, Politico reported that the administration of U.S. President Donald Trump was considering Dayton to be the nominee for U.S. Ambassador to Ukraine. On May 1, 2020, President Trump announced his intent to nominate Dayton to the position. On May 14, 2020, his nomination was sent to the United States Senate. On January 3, 2021, his nomination was returned to the President under Rule XXXI, Paragraph 6 of the United States Senate.

Dates of rank
Second Lieutenant (June 3, 1970)
First Lieutenant (June 3, 1971)
Captain (June 3, 1974)
Major (May 6, 1981)
Lieutenant Colonel (September 1, 1987)
Colonel (June 1, 1992)
Brigadier General (June 1, 1998)
Major General (October 1, 2001)
Lieutenant General (December 10, 2005)

Medals and decorations
  Defense Distinguished Service Medal with 2 Oak Leaf Clusters
  Army Distinguished Service Medal
  Defense Superior Service Medal
  Legion of Merit with 1 Oak Leaf Cluster
  Meritorious Service Medal
  Army Commendation Medal
 Basic Parachutist Badge
 Ranger Tab
 Joint Chiefs of Staff Identification Badge
 Army Staff Identification Badge

Formal education
College of William & Mary – B.S. - History (1970)
Cambridge University – M.A. - History
University of Southern California – M.A. - International Relations

Military education
Field Artillery Officer Basic Course – Ft. Sill, Oklahoma
Infantry Officer Advanced Course – Ft. Benning, Georgia (June 1977 – December 1977)
U.S. Army Command & General Staff College – Ft. Leavenworth, Kansas (August 1981 – June 1982)
Senior Service College Fellowship – Harvard University – Cambridge, Massachusetts (August 1989 – June 1990)
Foreign area officer Course – Ft. Bragg, North Carolina (January 1978 – June 1978)
Basic Russian Language Course – Defense Language Institute, Presidio of Monterey, California (June 1978 – June 1979)
Soviet Union Foreign Area Officer Overseas Training Program – U.S. Army Russian Institute, Germany (June 1979 – July 1981)

See also
 Peace Valley plan

References

Roy J. Panzarella, Ph.D. dissertation, University of Oklahoma (2006), Strategic Beacon in the Fog of Leadership: A Case Study of the Executive Military Leadership of the Iraq Study Group (which includes the official U.S. Army career summary of LTG Dayton to 2006)

Notes

1949 births
Living people
College of William & Mary alumni
Harvard University alumni
Alumni of the University of Cambridge
USC School of International Relations alumni
Recipients of the Distinguished Service Medal (US Army)
Recipients of the Legion of Merit
United States Army generals
United States Army personnel of the Iraq War
People of the Defense Intelligence Agency
Defense Language Institute alumni
Recipients of the Defense Superior Service Medal
Recipients of the Defense Distinguished Service Medal
United States military attachés
Ambassadors of the United States to Ukraine